Kalvan may refer to:
 Kalvan, Alborz, Iran
 Kalvan, Markazi, Iran
 Kalvan, West Azerbaijan, Iran
 Kalwan, India